Akhlystino is a rural locality (a selo) in Staronadezhdinsky Selsoviet, Blagoveshchensky District, Bashkortostan, Russia. The population was 344 as of 2010. There are 4 streets.

Geography 
Akhlystino is located 51 km northeast of Blagoveshchensk (the district's administrative centre) by road. Vladimirovka is the nearest rural locality.

References 

Rural localities in Blagoveshchensky District